Janq'u Q'awa (Aymara janq'u white, q'awa little river, ditch, crevice, fissure, gap in the earth, "white brook" or "white ravine", Hispanicized spelling  Aconcahua) is a mountain in the Andes of Peru, about  high. It is situated in the Puno Region, El Collao Province, Santa Rosa District. It lies northeast of the lake Lurisquta.

Janq'u Q'awa is also the name of an intermittent stream which originates near the mountain. It flows to Lurisquta.

References

Mountains of Puno Region
Mountains of Peru